AMW may refer to:

 America's Most Wanted
 America's Most Wanted (professional wrestling)
 A Moment's Worth, an American rock band from The Bronx, New York 
 Arab Media Watch, a UK media watchdog organisation 
 ASCII Media Works
 Asia MotorWorks, a Heavy commercial vehicle manufacturer in India